Venus Williams was the defending champion, but lost in the third round to Tatiana Golovin.

Justine Henin-Hardenne won the title, defeating Elena Dementieva in the final, 7–5, 6–4.

Seeds
The top eight seeds received a bye into the second round.

Draw

Finals

Top half

Section 1

Section 2

Bottom half

Section 3

Section 4

References

 Main Draw

Charleston Open
Family Circle Cup - Singles